Parambikulam Dam is an embankment dam on the Parambikulam River,
 
Parambikulam located in the Palakkad district in the Western Ghats of Kerala, India, ranks number one in India as well as in the top ten embankment dams in the world in volume in the year 2000.

This Dam was built at the time of Kamarajar. This is one of the Major irrigation schemes were planned in Kamaraj's period . The other projects are Lower Bhavani, Krishnagiri, Mani Muthuar, Cauvery delta, Aarani River, Vaigai Dam, Amravathi, Sathanur, Pullambadi, and Neyaru Dams. The dam is operated and maintained by Tamil Nadu but the ownership rests with Kerala, Per the agreement with Tamil Nadu, Kerala was supposed to receive 7.25 TMC feet of water per year from the Parambikulam-Aliyar Project of which the Parambikulam Dam is a part. In 2004, Kerala did not receive any water after February 10, resulting in the drying up of paddy in thousands of acres in Chittur taluk. Since this agreement has still not been met as of July 2006, Kerala Water Resources Minister has called for a review of the project agreement.

On 17 October 2012, Kerala and Tamil Nadu reached an accord on Parambikulam-Aliyar water.

See also
List of dams and reservoirs in India
Embankment dam

Reference notes

Dams in Kerala
Embankment dams
Reservoirs in Kerala
Buildings and structures in Palakkad district
Year of establishment missing